After incumbent congressman Frank Tejeda died of brain cancer soon after the congressional elections, a special election was held to fill Texas's 28th congressional district. Since no candidate received an outright majority during the first round on March 15, a special runoff was held on April 12, 1997, which was won by State Representative Ciro Rodriguez.

Primary results

Results

References

Texas 1997 28
Texas 1997 28
1997 28
Texas 28
United States House of Representatives 28
United States House of Representatives 1997 28